The 2020 European Rally Championship was the 68th season of the FIA European Rally Championship, the European continental championship series in rallying. The season was also the eighth following the merge between the European Rally Championship and the Intercontinental Rally Challenge. Chris Ingram was the reigning champion, but did not return to defend the title. Alexey Lukyanuk won the championship in Citroën C3 R5.

ERC Classes
The classes are:
FIA ERC: Main class, for FIA-homologated cars with R5 regulations.
FIA ERC2: Second tier, for cars more standard, albeit with turbocharged engines and four-wheel drive. This class allows the N4, the R4-K and RGT rules.
FIA ERC3: Third ERC tier, for front-wheel-drive cars. Allows R3 and R2 cars.
FIA ERC1 Junior: For drivers aged 28 and under on 1 January 2020 in R5 cars.
FIA ERC3 Junior: For drivers aged 27 and under on 1 January 2020 in R2 cars on Pirelli control tyres.
ERC Ladies Trophy: for female drivers including all classes (ERC1, ERC2 and ERC3) eligible.
Abarth Rally Cup: for Abarth 124 Rally RGT cars. 
FIA European Rally Championship for Teams: each team can nominate a maximum of three cars (from all categories), counting the two highest-placed cars from each team.
ERC Nations Cup: like the ERC for Teams but for teams supported by a national motorsport federation or automobile association.

Calendar

The final 2020 calendar featured 5 rallies - 4 tarmac rounds and only 1 gravel round. Rally di Roma Capitale turned out to be the inaugural event. Rally Liepaja was the second and the only gravel round. Rally Fafe Montelongo was added to calendar during the season after the cancelation of multiple events as the third round. Rally Hungary and Rally Islas Canarias remained in the calendar.

Teams and drivers

ERC

ERC 2

Results and standings

Season summary

Scoring system

Only the four best results out of the five rounds counted towards the championship. Points for final position were awarded as in following table:

Bonus points awarded for position in each Leg:

Drivers' Championships

ERC

Notes

References

External links
 

2020 in rallying
Rally
2020